Leptotrochila is a genus of fungi in the family Dermateaceae. The genus contains 16 species.

Species
Leptotrochila astrantiae
Leptotrochila axillaris
Leptotrochila bartsiae
Leptotrochila cerastiorum
Leptotrochila dehnii
Leptotrochila euphrasiae
Leptotrochila jasiones
Leptotrochila lugubris
Leptotrochila medicaginis
Leptotrochila pedicularis
Leptotrochila phyteumatis
Leptotrochila porri
Leptotrochila prunellae
Leptotrochila radians
Leptotrochila ranunculi
Leptotrochila repanda
Leptotrochila sanguisorbae
Leptotrochila svalbardensis
Leptotrochila trifolii-arvensis
Leptotrochila verrucosa

See also
 List of Dermateaceae genera

References

External links
Leptotrochila at Index Fungorum

Dermateaceae genera
Taxa named by Petter Adolf Karsten
Taxa described in 1871